Samantha Cornish (born 27 October 1980) is a professional surfer from New South Wales, Australia. She began surfing at an early age and entered her first competition at the age of 11. Her father, Peter Cornish, was also a professional surfer. At the age of 15 she won the 1996 World Junior Championships. In 2002, she entered the World Championship Tournament (WCT). She has been sponsored by various companies such as Quiksilver.

Accomplishments
 1st - Billabong Pro Maui (2003)
 1st - Quiksilver Roxy Pro Gold Coast (2000)
 1st - Billabong Junior Series Burleigh Heads (2000)
 The Rip Curl Australian Junior Title (1998) 
 1st- Billabong Girls Pro Itacare Brazil 2007
 World Number One, October 2007, following win in Brazil

References

External links
World Surfers profile
Tahitian Noni profile
Surf Line

1980 births
World Surf League surfers
Living people
Australian female surfers